Niuatoputapu was the indigenous language of Niuatoputapu, Tonga.  It was more closely related to Samoan than to Tongan. Sometime in the 18th or 19th century, it became extinct and its use was replaced by Tongan. Practically all knowledge of the Niuatoputapu language comes from a word list compiled by Jacob Le Maire in 1616.

Sample phrases

References

Samoic languages
Extinct languages of Oceania
Languages of Tonga
Languages extinct in the 19th century
19th-century disestablishments in Oceania